Grypotheca pertinax is a moth of the Psychidae family first described by John S. Dugdale in 1987. It is endemic to New Zealand.

References

Moths described in 1987
Psychidae
Moths of New Zealand
Endemic fauna of New Zealand
Endemic moths of New Zealand